Delivery is an Australian garage-punk band formed in 2020. They released their debut album in November 2022.

History
Delivery were formed in 2020 by couple Rebecca Allan and James Lynch and included members from several Melbourne bands, including The Vacant Smiles, Gutter Girls and Blonde Revolver. They played their first live show in March 2021.
 
In June 2021, the group released their debut EP Yes We Do.
 
Between January to April 2022, the group recorded songs for their debut album. In September 2022, the band released the lead single, "Baader Meinhof".

In October, the band released the single "The Complex" and announced the forthcoming released of their debut album Forever Giving Handshakes.

Doug Wallen from NME gave the album 4 out of 5 calling it "[a] lively record full of guitar interplay and sociopolitical critique". Conor Lochrie from Tone Deaf said "Forever Giving Handshakes is an exercise in controlled chaos, songs threatening to fall apart at any moment, but it all coolly remains together" adding "Underneath the rapid-fire vocal delivery, intricate guitar interplay is rife; it's always a case of more is more."

Members

Current members
Rebecca Allan - vocals, bass
James Lynch - vocals, guitar, synth
Sam Harding - vocals, guitar, synth
Lisa Rashleigh - vocals, guitar
Daniel Devlin - drums, backing vocals (2021–present)

Former members
Seamus Whelan (2020–2021)

Discography

Albums

Extended plays

Notes

References

Musical groups from Melbourne
2020 establishments in Australia
Musical groups established in 2020
Garage punk groups